The EDAPS Consortium was a consortium which manufactured identification documents and information systems. It was founded in Kyiv in 2004 by eight leading Ukrainian security printing and information technology companies. In December 2016, the consortium was dissolved in view of the fact that it was a temporary association of companies in the first place and that the common goals to be achieved by its participants (implementation of joint projects, scientific, technical and construction cooperation) have been achieved.

History 
The EDAPS Consortium has fulfilled over 300 large-scale projects. According to ID World it is among the Top-50 world manufacturers of electronic passports. The documents developed and implemented by EDAPS are appreciated by the ICAO, EU, ОSCЕ, Interpol. EDAPS produces electronic passports and ID-cards for INTERPOL officers. EDAPS has created certified production facilities, including enterprises on issuing and outsourcing personalization of Visa and Mastercard payment cards.

2004 

 March 2004, EDAPS won the tender for designing and producing Ukrainian travel passports.
 September 2004, Presentation of State Centre for Document Personalization, the up-to-date enterprise for personalization of identification documents, including personalization methods with laser engraving and laser perforation.
 December 2004, EDAPS became an associate member of Intergraf - The European Federation for Print & Digital Communication -Intergraf. EDAPS remained an associate member of Intergraf until 2012.

2005 

 July 2005, Znak Ltd. (manufacture of plastic cards and ID-document application forms) started its manufacturing activity.

2006 

 January 2006, the EDAPS Consortium proceeded to manufacture national driving licenses and vehicle registration certificates on a plastic base in Ukraine.

2007 

 June 2007, the EDAPS Consortium designed and presented the prototype of the electronic (biometric) travel passport.
 June 2007, the EDAPS Consortium commenced the realization of the national program on implementation of new travel passports with a polycarbonate data page in Ukraine. * October 2007, INCOM Corporation became a member of the EDAPS Consortium.

2008 

 February 2008, SE Holography Ltd., the EDAPS Consortium member, presented the technologies of demetallization of high resolution holograms.
 April 2008, EDAPS won the international tender for creation of a demographic register in Kenya. EDAPS concluded a contract with De Beers Diamond Jewellers (Great Britain) on development of a global identification system for De Beers jewelry and issuance of De Beers Diamond Passports (which guarantee the authenticity of jewellery at any De Beers jewelry store).
 July–August 2008, EDAPS won a tender for development of the National Register of Voters of Ukraine.
 September 2008, the EDAPS Consortium member – POLLY-SERVICE company – opened the Interbank Personalization Bureau.
 November 2008, the Ministry of Internal Affairs of Ukraine opened the Interregional Centre for Passport Document Issuance established upon the basis of EDAPS Consortium technologies.

2009 

 February 2009, the EDAPS Consortium implemented the Integrated Population Registration System of Kenya (IPRS), using biometric technologies.
 October 2009, the EDAPS Consortium was officially appointed as the manufacturer of electronic passports for Interpol officers.
 October 2009, ZNAK enterprise,  a member of the EDAPS Consortium, became the first Ukrainian manufacturer of payment cards containing a microchip for Bank-Members of the UkrCard Payment System.

2010 

 March 2010, the American Cancer Society and World Lung Foundation recognized Ukraine as the world leader in combating illegal trade in tobacco products, and the Ukrainian EDAPS Consortium technologies to be the most efficient.
 April 2010, a delegation from the National Academy of Sciences of Ukraine headed by NAS President Boris Paton visited the EDAPS Consortium. The scientists invited EDAPS to cooperate in innovations.
 October 2010, at the Intergraf-2010 world forum in Barcelona, the EDAPS Consortium presented its own equipment for laser engraving and electronic personalization of ID-documents.
 November 2010, General Assembly of INTERPOL announced the initiative of INTERPOL on implementation of electronic (biometric) passports and ID-cards, and selected the EDAPS Consortium as their manufacturer.

2016 

 December 2010, the EDAPS Consortium was dissolved due to achieving common goals by its member companies (implementation of joint projects, scientific, technical and construction cooperation)

Production

 Machine-readable Ukrainian passports of citizens of Ukraine for travelling abroad with a polycarbonate data page.

The launch of new Ukrainian travel passports was started in June 2007. The passport has 25 security levels, beating the number of security levels present in Ukrainian banknotes. The passport design contains the traditional ornamental motifs and heraldry of Ukraine and its regions. Passport personalization is fulfilled by the State Centre for Document Personalization, using laser engraving and perforation technologies. The recorded information cannot be changed without destroying the form itself.

 The National Information System and a network of centres under the Ministry of Internal Affairs (MIA) of Ukraine for registration and issuance of the Ukrainian travel passports.

The MIA of Ukraine performs application, registration and issuance of the travel passports with the use of EDAPS technologies within the State Information System of Individual Persons Registration and Documentation (SIS).

 Driving licenses and vehicle registration certificates of Ukraine.

In 2006 Ukraine started the production of national driving licenses and vehicle registration certificates in the form of plastic cards, protected with holographic security elements. The documents are designed by the EDAPS Consortium. The driving licenses were highly appreciated by the European Union.

 Licenses for bearing and keeping arms in the form of plastic cards.
 A crew member certificate on a plastic basis.
 Electronic vehicle technical inspection card.
 Production of paper document forms for Ministry of Internal Affairs of Ukraine system.
 Production of De Beers Diamond Passports.

For De Beers Diamond Jewellers (Great Britain) the EDAPS Consortium has created a world identification system for identification of the De Beers jewellery, and has been issuing the De Beers Diamond Passports, which certify the authenticity of jewelry at any De Beers jeweller’s. These ID-documents in the form of a booklet with a polycarbonate data page are highly protected. All data about De Beers jewellery is recorded in the passport page by  laser engraving. Personalization of De Beers Passports is performed at the Personalization Bureau. The passport is protected with 29 security elements. EDAPS Consortium also provides secure access to De Beers information resources in all points of sale worldwide.

 Production of electronic documents for INTERPOL officers.

On November 8, 2010 the General Assembly of International Criminal Police Organization (INTERPOL) announced the initiative of INTERPOL on implementation of electronic (biometric) passports and ID-cards, and selected the EDAPS Consortium as their manufacturer.

 Bank cards production and personalization.

Two EDAPS enterprises: Znak Ltd., plastic cards manufacturer, and POLLY-SERVICE company, personalization services provider, ensure the entire range of technological services supporting any bank emission programs: from the development and production of the card design to the delivery of personal cards and PIN in individual envelopes with personal marketing enclosures. There are over 60 big Ukrainian and foreign banks among EDAPS clients. The EDAPS Consortium supplies payment smart-cards for the National System of Mass Electronic Payments (NSMEP).

 Holographic elements for protection of goods and documents.

More than 400 corporate and Government companies are clients of EDAPS and need the holographic security of documents and goods, including excisable ones. Specialists of the Specialized Enterprise HOLOGRAPHY, a member of the EDAPS Consortium, designed the state-of-the-art technologies for hologram production: demetallized high resolution holograms, bigrams, BEPRINT holograms, etc.

 Establishment of the National Population Register of Kenya.

The EDAPS Consortium developed and implemented the Integrated Population Registration System (IPRS) in Kenya. The IPRS construction is an integral part of a huge project on establishment of the National Population Register (NPR) of Kenya.

 National Register of Voters.

EDAPS takes part in development of the automated information and telecommunication system National Register of Voters in Ukraine.

Certification 

EDAPS enterprises have all the necessary licenses and certificates, allowing the rendering of the entire range of services to clients in the manufacture of ID-documents, information systems, payment, holographic elements etc.

The EDAPS Consortium members 

KP VTI, OJSC
ZNAK Ltd.
State Enterprise State Centre for Document Personalization
POLLY-SERVICE Ltd.
Specialized Enterprise HOLOGRAPHY Ltd.
COMMERCIAL INDUSTRIAL BANK, JSC
3-Т Ltd.
INCOM Corporation

See also 
 Consortium

References 

 Gazeta 2000
 Interpol
 Kyivpost
 Gazeta.ua
 Korrespondent
 UNIAN
 Bagnet

Trade associations based in Ukraine
Ukrainian companies established in 2004